The Fruit Flyer was a fast overnight freight train operated by the Victorian Railways to bring fruit produce from the Mildura district to the Melbourne Markets. It first ran on 13 October 1958.

It departed  Mildura at 17:00, loading at Irymple, Red Cliffs, Carwarp and Hattah before running express to Dynon Freight Terminal arriving at 03:00. To allow it to operate at the line speed of 110 km/h, the wagons were fitted with bogies similar to those fitted on passenger carriages.

It initially operated three times weekly on Monday, Wednesday and Friday nights, but within a few weeks this had increased to four times. By 1961 it was running six times a week, Sunday to Friday.

References

Night trains of Australia
Railway services introduced in 1958
Rail transport in Victoria (Australia)
1958 establishments in Australia
Discontinued railway services in Australia
Rail freight transport in Australia
History of transport in Victoria (Australia)
Mildura